The Armagh by-election was held on 20 November 1954, following the resignation of Ulster Unionist Party Member of Parliament James Harden.

Harden had held the seat of Armagh since a by-election in 1948, and had not faced a contest since then.  The seat had been held continually by Ulster Unionists since its recreation for the 1922 general election.

Candidates
The Ulster Unionists stood C. W. Armstrong, the son of former Mid Armagh MP Henry Bruce Armstrong.  He had served in the British Army and been involved in the oil industry in Burma, serving from 1940 to 1942 in that country's House of Representatives.

The two main opposition groups, the Northern Ireland Labour Party and the Nationalist Party, had both fared poorly at the 1953 Northern Ireland general election, and decided not to contest the by-election.

Result
With only one candidate for the seat, Armstrong was declared elected unopposed. This was the last unopposed election in any Westminster seat.  Armstrong held the seat until the 1959 general election, when he stood down.

References

1954 elections in the United Kingdom
20th century in County Armagh
November 1954 events in the United Kingdom
By-elections to the Parliament of the United Kingdom in County Armagh constituencies
Unopposed by-elections to the Parliament of the United Kingdom in Northern Irish constituencies
1954 elections in Northern Ireland